Salvatore Philip Butera (born September 25, 1952) is an American former professional baseball catcher.  He was a major league scout for the Toronto Blue Jays of Major League Baseball during the 2015 season.

Playing career
Signed by the Minnesota Twins as an amateur free agent in 1972, Butera made his major league debut in an extra innings game against the Oakland Athletics on April 10, 1980. He struck out in his only at bat.

Butera remained with the Twins as Butch Wynegar's back-up until Spring training 1983 when he was dealt to the Detroit Tigers. Injuries limited Butera to only four games with the Tigers, with most of his season being spent with their Triple-A affiliate, the Evansville Triplets. He was released at the end of the season.

Butera spent the 1984 season with the Montreal Expos triple A American Association affiliate, the Indianapolis Indians, and appeared in three games for the Expos following a September call-up. After the 1985 season, he was dealt to the Cincinnati Reds with Bill Gullickson for Dann Bilardello, Andy McGaffigan, John Stuper and Jay Tibbs. He was released by Cincinnati during the 1987 season, and was immediately re-signed by his original franchise, the Minnesota Twins. Butera was a member of the Twins team that defeated the St. Louis Cardinals in the 1987 World Series. He was released, re-signed, and released again by the Twins during the 1987–1988 offseason, then was signed by the Toronto Blue Jays, where he played in 23 more games.

Coaching and scouting career
Butera was the video replay and catching coach for the Toronto Blue Jays during the 2014 season. He became a major league scout for the 2015 season.

Honors
Sal was inducted into the Suffolk Sports Hall of Fame on Long Island in the Baseball Category with the Class of 2002.

Personal
Sal and his wife have a son, Drew, born August 9, 1983, who also played for the Minnesota Twins during his baseball career, and who is currently a member of the Los Angeles Angels' coaching staff.

References

External links
, or Retrosheet, or Pura Pelota

1952 births
Living people
Baseball coaches from New York (state)
American people of Italian descent
American expatriate baseball players in Canada
Baseball players from New York (state)
Cincinnati Reds players
Detroit Tigers players
Evansville Triplets players
Fort Lauderdale Yankees players
Gulf Coast White Sox players
Indianapolis Indians players
Lynchburg Twins players
Major League Baseball catchers
Minnesota Twins players
Minor league baseball managers
Montreal Expos players
Orlando Juice players
People from Richmond Hill, Queens
Portland Beavers players
Suffolk County Community College alumni
Syracuse Chiefs players
Tacoma Twins players
Tigres de Aragua players
American expatriate baseball players in Venezuela
Toledo Mud Hens players
Toronto Blue Jays coaches
Toronto Blue Jays players
Toronto Blue Jays scouts